This is a list of vice presidents of the United States by age. The first table charts the age of each vice president of the United States at the time of their inauguration (first inauguration if they were elected to multiple and consecutive terms), at the time they left office, and at the time of their death. Each vice president's age at death, their lifespan, is measured in two ways; this is to allow for the differing number of leap days occurring within each one's life. The first figure is the number of days between date of birth and date of death, allowing for leap days; in parentheses the same period given in years and days, with the years being the number of whole years that the vice president lived, and the days being the number of days after their last birthday.

Age of vice presidents

The median age upon accession to the vice presidency is around 54 years and 10 months. This is about how old John Adams and Hubert Humphrey were at the time they entered office. He was also the oldest when he left office.

Born on January 16, 1821, John C. Breckinridge was younger than five of his successors, the greatest number to date: Andrew Johnson; Hannibal Hamlin; Henry Wilson; William A. Wheeler; and Thomas A. Hendricks.

Born on July 8, 1908, Nelson Rockefeller was older than five of his predecessors, the greatest number to date: Lyndon B. Johnson; Hubert Humphrey; Richard Nixon; Gerald Ford; and Spiro Agnew.

Three vice presidents—Hannibal Hamlin, Charles G. Dawes, and Lyndon B. Johnson—were born on August 27 (in 1809, 1865, and 1908 respectively). This is the only day of the year having the birthday of multiple vice presidents.

The oldest living vice president is Dick Cheney, born on January 30, 1941 (age ). The youngest living vice president is the incumbent, Kamala Harris, born on October 20, 1964 (age ). He is one of six U.S. vice presidents (along with Levi P. Morton, George H. W. Bush, Gerald Ford, Walter Mondale and John Adams) to have lived into their 90s.

Daniel D. Tompkins had the shortest post-vice-presidency timespan, dying just three months after leaving office. Walter Mondale had the longest post-vice-presidency timespan, dying 40 years after leaving office.

Vice presidential age-related data

Notes

References

United States, Vice Presidents
Age